The Union of Public Services (GÖD), is a trade union representing public service workers in Austria.

The union was founded in 1945 by the Austrian Trade Union Federation, and by 1998 it had 229,778 members.  It was particularly strong in administration, with many teachers also holding membership.

Presidents
1945: Franz Rubant
1948: Fritz Koubek
1968: Alfred Gasperschitz
1977: Rudolf Sommer
1989: Siegfried Dohr
1997: Fritz Neugebauer
2016: Norbert Schnedl

External links

References

Public sector trade unions
Trade unions established in 1945
Trade unions in Austria
1945 establishments in Austria